Olga Vladimirovna Korobova  (born September 15, 1978) is a Russian political and public figure.   Deputy Chair of the State Duma since 2021 (member of the State Duma Committee on Family, Women and Children).  United Russia's party member.

References

External links
 Ольга Коробова — мать для всех детей Калужской области
 Ольга Коробова: «Во всём, что случается с детьми, виноваты взрослые»

1978 births
Children's rights
Living people
Children's Ombudsmen
Ombudsmen in Russia
People from Balashikha
Kaluga State University alumni
United Russia politicians
21st-century Russian politicians
Russian human rights activists
Women human rights activists
Eighth convocation members of the State Duma (Russian Federation)
21st-century Russian women politicians
Russian individuals subject to European Union sanctions
Russian individuals subject to United Kingdom sanctions
Russian individuals subject to the U.S. Department of the Treasury sanctions